¡Ando Bien Pedo! (I Am Very Drunk) is the title of a studio album released by regional Mexican group Banda Los Recoditos in 2010. The album became their first number-one title in the Billboard Top Latin Albums chart. The lead single of the same name peaked at number-one in the Hot Latin Songs and Regional Mexican Songs charts in the United States. Ando Bien Pedo received a nomination for Best Banda Album at the 11th Latin Grammy Awards. The album has sold more than 550,000 copies worldwide.

Track listing 
The information from Allmusic.

Charts

Weekly charts

Year-end charts

Sales and certifications

See also
 List of number-one Billboard Latin Albums from the 2010s

References 

2010 albums
Banda Los Recoditos albums
Spanish-language albums
Disa Records albums